Yours, Mine & The Truth is the Vol. 2 studio album by American R&B singer Sterling Simms. The album was formerly known as Worth Your While, before being renamed. The album was released on December 23, 2008 by Disturbing Tha Peace Records and One Records.

Singles
The album's first single was "Vicky Gets Fired" featuring Sean P was released in 2006. The single performed under expectations peaking at number 56 on Billboard'''s Hot R&B/Hip-Hop Songs chart. The announced second single was "Nasty Girl", released in 2007. The single fared worse than the first single peaking at number 17 on the Bubbling Under R&B/Hip-Hop Singles (#117 Hot R&B/Hip-Hop Songs). As a result, the single was scrapped and the album was delayed. This single does not appear on the album. The new single off his album is "All I Need" and features label-mates The-Dream and Ludacris. The single samples Method Man's "I Need Love". The song peaked at #23 on the Bubbling Under R&B/Hip-Hop Singles (#123 Hot R&B/Hip-Hop Songs).

Though not announced as a single, A music video for "Boom Boom Room" was created. The video starred Sarah Rosete from girl group Electrik Red.

Track listing

Chart positions
The album debuted at No. 100 on the Billboard'' Top R&B/Hip-Hop Albums chart while missing the Billboard 200 altogether. Two weeks later (charting week of December 24), the album rose to No. 89. As of December 19, current album sales are at 15,372+ sales to date.

References

External links
Official website

2008 debut albums
Albums produced by Tricky Stewart
Sterling Simms albums
Albums produced by Oak Felder